Dagmar Calla Johanna Nilsson (later Törnblom, 29 January 1894 – 6 April 1974) was a Swedish diver. She competed in the 1912 Summer Olympics, but was eliminated in the first round of the 10 m platform event.

References

1894 births
1974 deaths
Swedish female divers
Olympic divers of Sweden
Divers at the 1912 Summer Olympics
Stockholms KK divers
Divers from Stockholm